{{Automatic_taxobox
| image =
| image_caption = 
| display_parents = 2
| taxon = Acanthasargus
| authority = White, 1914
| type_species = Acanthasargus palustris
| type_species_authority =White, 1914
| synonyms = *Acanthosargus James, 1950Timorimyia Frey, 1934
}}Acanthasargus is a genus of flies in the family Stratiomyidae.

SpeciesAcanthasargus bidentatus (Frey, 1934)Acanthasargus flavipes Hardy, 1932Acanthasargus gracilis White, 1916Acanthasargus inflatus James, 1950Acanthasargus palustris White, 1914Acanthasargus varipes'' Hardy, 1932

References

Stratiomyidae
Brachycera genera
Diptera of Asia
Diptera of Australasia